Phimon Rat is one of the eight subdistricts (tambon) of Bang Bua Thong District, in Nonthaburi Province, Thailand. The subdistrict is bounded by (clockwise from north) Bang Bua Thong, Sano Loi, Lahan, Bang Phlap, Om Kret, Bang Rak Phatthana, Bang Khu Rat, Thawi Watthana and Sai Noi subdistricts. In 2020 it had a total population of 52,684 people.

Administration

Central administration
The subdistrict is subdivided into 8 administrative villages (muban).

Local administration
The area of the subdistrict is shared by two local administrative organizations.
Phimon Rat Town Municipality
Bang Bua Thong Town Municipality

References

External links
Website of Phimon Rat Town Municipality
Website of Bang Bua Thong Town Municipality

Tambon of Nonthaburi province
Populated places in Nonthaburi province